Henry Cooke (c. 1616 – 13 July 1672) commonly known as Captain Cooke, was an English composer, choirmaster and singer. He was a boy chorister in the Chapel Royal and by the outbreak of the English Civil War was a Gentleman of the Chapel Royal. He joined the Royalist cause, in the service of which he rose to the rank of captain. With the Restoration of Charles II he returned to the Chapel Royal as Master of the Children and was responsible for the rebuilding of the chapel and the introduction of instrumental music into the services. The choristers in his charge included his successor and eventual son-in-law Pelham Humfrey, as well as Henry Purcell and John Blow.

On reconstituting the choir of the Chapel Royal, Dussuaze states:

Cooke was one of the five English composers who created music for Sir William Davenant's The Siege of Rhodes (1656), often called the first English opera.

References 
 

1610s births
1672 deaths
17th-century English composers
English male composers
Gentlemen of the Chapel Royal
Masters of the Children of the Chapel Royal
Children of the Chapel Royal
17th-century male musicians